Puthiya Vaanam is a 1988 Indian Tamil-language action drama film directed by R. V. Udayakumar. The film stars Sivaji Ganesan, Sathyaraj, Rupini, and Gautami. The film, produced by G. Thyagarajan and V. Thamilazhagan, was released on 10 December 1988. It was also the 275th film of Sivaji Ganesan. The film is a remake of Hindi film Hukumat.

Plot 
In the past, the honest military officer Jeevadurai was killed by Govindan. Thereafter, Rajaratnam, Jeevadurai's son, was brought up by D.I.G. Pandidurai. A few years later, Rajaratnam marries Devaki and they then have a son. Like his father, Rajaratnam becomes a police officer. In Shanthi Nagar, Govindan, who is now known as Kocha, controls the city and the people are afraid of him and his henchmen. His adopted father Pandidurai transfers Rajaratnam to Shanthi Nagar.

Cast 

Sivaji Ganesan as D.I.G. Pandidurai
Sathyaraj as M. G. Rajaratnam (MGR)
Rupini as Devaki
Gautami as Mary
Vijayakumar as Kocha / Govindan
Janagaraj as Pattabi
Rajesh Kumar as Joni, Kocha's son
Nassar
Charle
LIC Narasimhan as Samuel
K. Natraj
Ponnambalam
Oru Viral Krishna Rao
Idichapuli Selvaraj
Ennatha Kannaiya
Sethu Vinayagam
Gundu Kalyanam
Baby Sujitha
Kuyili
Disco Shanti
Anuja
Jai Ganesh as Jeevadurai (guest appearance)

Soundtrack 
The soundtrack was composed by Hamsalekha, with lyrics written by Muthulingam, Gangai Amaran, Ilandevan and R. V. Udayakumar.

Reception 
The Indian Express wrote, "Under enterprising young filmmaker Udayakumar's direction, debutant cameraman Ravi Yadav imparts a glow and sheen to the frames [..]".

References

External links 

1980s action drama films
1980s Tamil-language films
1988 films
Films directed by R. V. Udayakumar
Films scored by Hamsalekha
Indian action drama films
Tamil remakes of Hindi films